Lexibank is a linguistics database managed by the Max Planck Institute for Evolutionary Anthropology in Leipzig, Germany. The database consists of over 100 standardized wordlists (datasets) that are independently curated.

Description
Lexibank datasets are presented in the Cross-Linguistic Data Format (CLDF).

Phonological and lexical features are automatically computed in Lexibank.

The datasets are publicly accessible and are archived at Zenodo and are also publicly available on GitHub. Lexibank is also part of the Cross-Linguistic Linked Data project. All of the datasets are released under the CC BY 4.0 license.

Applications of the database include historical linguistics and comparative phonology.

List of datasets
The following is a list of Lexibank (version 0.2) datasets as of 17 June 2022.

References

External links
Lexibank community on Zenodo
Master list of wordlist datasets
Glottobank

Cross-Linguistic Linked Data
Word lists
Linguistics websites
Linguistics databases
Lexical databases